Venez tous mes amis! is a compilation album of 17 songs by French singer of Jewish Algerian origin Enrico Macias in duo collaborations with other artists. It is in celebration of 50 years of a musical career in France and internationally. 

15 are well-known Enrico Macias hits, and two are special new songs for the album
"Ces etrangers": a new song written for Enrico Macias' album by Bruno Maman, and sang as a duo with Erico Macias
"L'Algerie": a song by Serge Lama, that Enrico Macias chose to sing as a duo with the author as a tribute to his native country Algeria.

Track list
"Adieu mon pays" (3:12) – with Cali
"Le mendiant de l'amour" (2:42) – with Mikael Miro
"Les filles de mon pays" (3:00) – with Dany Brillant
"Les gens du Nord" (3:20) – with Carla Bruni
"Oranges amères" (3:27) – with Corneille
"L'Oriental" (3:47) – with Khaled
"Paris tu m'as pris dans tes bras" (2:42) – with Sofia Essaidi
"Aux talons de ses souliers" (3:12) – with Riff Cohen
"Sans voir le jour" (3:49) – with Gérard Darmon
"Dis-moi ce qui ne va pas" (3:07) – with Natasha Saint Pier
"Il reste aujourd'hui (venez tous mes amis)" (2:23) – with Cabra Casay
"Oumparere" (2:42) – with Dani
"Ces etrangers" (3:23) – with Bruno Maman
"Mon histoire c'est ton histoire" (2:32) – with Toma
"L'Algérie" (4:03)
"Mon cœur d'attache" (3:40) – with Liane Foly
"J'ai perdu 25 kilos" (2:15) – with Valérie Lemercier

Charts

References

Enrico Macias albums
2012 compilation albums
Collaborative albums